Duramax may refer to:

Duramax V8 engine, a turbocharged V-8 Diesel engine designed and built by General Motors
Isuzu 6H Engine, a 6-cylinder commercial Diesel engine, re-branded "Duramax" for GM trucks
VM Motori A 428 DOHC, a 4-cylinder engine carrying the 'Duramax' brand name that is used in Chevrolet Colorado/Chevrolet S10/Holden Colorado/GMC Canyon
Duramax I6 engine, a 3.0L turbocharged I-6 Diesel engine found in the 2020 model year 1500 series pickup offerings from General Motors (RPO code: LM2)